John Lister (1587 – 1640) was an English merchant and politician who sat in the House of Commons variously between 1621 and 1640.

Lister was the son of John Lister, a lead merchant of Hull who was mayor and MP for the town.

Lister succeeded his father and in 1618 also became Mayor of Hull and in 1621 was also elected Member of Parliament for Kingston upon Hull (Hull). He was re-elected in subsequent elections until King Charles I decided to rule without parliament in 1629. In 1629 Lister was again mayor of Hull and was knighted in 1632. In 1639 Lister entertained King Charles  to a sumptuous dinner at his house in High Street.

In April 1640, Lister was re-elected MP for Hull in the Short Parliament and was re-elected in November 1640 for the Long Parliament. However he died in December.

Lister funded a hospital, which opened in 1641, for twelve elderly people, with rooms for a lecturer.

The  house of the Lister family is now a museum known as the Wilberforce House Museum.

References

 

1587 births
1640 deaths
Politicians from Kingston upon Hull
Mayors of Kingston upon Hull
English MPs 1621–1622
English MPs 1624–1625
English MPs 1625
English MPs 1626
English MPs 1628–1629
English MPs 1640 (April)
English MPs 1640–1648
Businesspeople from the Kingdom of England